Mark Lipsky was the Executive Producer of The Nutty Professor (Jada Pinkett Smith), Metro which The A.V. Club called "too lazily assembled, and too stingy with the jokes, to even live up to its modest ambitions", Beverly Hills Cop III "considered by critics and admittedly by Murphy himself as the most disappointing film in the series", Goosed, Boomerang (Halle Berry, Martin Lawrence), Another 48 Hrs. (Nick Nolte) and Coming to America (James Earl Jones), Vampire in Brooklyn (Angela Bassett) and Harlem Nights (Richard Pryor, Danny Aiello), all starring Eddie Murphy.  In addition, Lipsky has produced Tony n' Tina's Wedding and executive produced Precinct Hollywood for AMC.

Lipsky and his wife Judy live in New Jersey.  They have three children and eight grandchildren.

Filmography
He was producer for all films unless otherwise noted.

Film

Miscellaneous crew

Television

References

External links

Living people
Year of birth missing (living people)